Bibi Sakineh Rural District is in Safadasht District of Malard County, Tehran province, Iran. At the National Census of 2006, its population (as a part of the former Malard District of Shahriar County) was 16,003 in 3,894 households. There were 17,740 inhabitants in 4,804 households at the following census of 2011, by which time the district had been separated from the county and Malard County established. At the most recent census of 2016, the population of the rural district was 17,399 in 4,987 households. The largest of its 17 villages was Amirabad, with 5,221 people.

References 

Malard County

Rural Districts of Tehran Province

Populated places in Tehran Province

Populated places in Malard County